María Cristina Ramos (born 1952) is an Argentine writer and educator. Known primarily for her children's books, she was awarded the SM Ibero-American Prize for Children's and Youth Literature in 2016. In 2020, she was named a finalist for the Hans Christian Andersen Award.

Biography 
Ramos was born in San Rafael, Mendoza, Argentina, in 1952. She has lived most of her life in Neuquén.

In 1988, Ramos published her first children's book, the poetry anthology Un sol para tu sombrero (A Sun for Your Hat). She has since published over 50 works. Her books have been translated into English, Chinese, Korean, and Portuguese. In 2002, Ramos established her own publishing company, Editorial Ruedamares.

Ramos is a teacher educator who, in addition to children's literature, writes pedagogical texts. She has led reading initiatives at the regional and national level.

Awards and honours 
In 2016, Ramos won the SM Ibero-American Prize for Children's and Youth Literature (worth €26,701).

In 2020, she was named one of six finalists for the International Board on Books for Young People's Hans Christian Andersen Award, one of the top prizes for writers of children's literature. Ramos was the second Argentine author to earn this nomination after María Teresa Andruetto, who won the award in 2012.

Selected works 

 Azul la cordillera (Blue, the Mountain Chain), 1995. 
 Ruedamares, pirata de la mar bravia (Wheel-seas, Pirate of the Brave Sea), 1997. 
 La luna lleva un silencio (The Moon Carried a Silence), 2005.  
 Mientras duermen las piedras (Meanwhile the Stones Are Sleeping), 2009. 
 El trasluz (Against the Light), 2013.

References 

1952 births
20th-century Argentine women writers
20th-century Argentine writers
21st-century Argentine women writers
21st-century Argentine writers
Argentine children's writers
Argentine women children's writers
Living people